Vulcaniella grabowiella is a moth of the family Cosmopterigidae. It is found from the Iberian Peninsula to Asia Minor.

The wingspan is 7–9 mm.

The larvae feed on various Lamiaceae species, including Lavandula stoechas, Thymus vulgaris and Thymus algeriensis numidicus. They mine the leaves of their host plant. The create a mine without frass. The larva lives free on the plant in a case made of silk and densely covered with frass grains. The case resembles a Coleophora case, but is less regularly constructed. At times, larvae also spin leaves together.

References

External links
bladmineerders.nl
Fauna Europaea

Moths described in 1859
Vulcaniella
Moths of Europe
Moths of Asia